The Eel River are a Native American tribe who at the time of European settlement lived along the (Northern) Eel River in what is today Indiana. They were sometimes classified as part of the Miami Indians as well as often being confused with the Wea, the Pankishaw and the Pokias.

A book of sources about the Eel River Tribe of Indiana has been compiled and published by Mike Floyd.

In recent times a group calling itself The Eel River Tribe of Indiana has been revived by Floyd, who was elected Chief.  They have held gatherings in 2008 and 2009. In 2001, Eel River Tribe members appeared in the PBS series We Shall Remain.

References

Further reading
Eckert, Allan W., That Dark and Bloody River. (New York: Bantam Books, 1995) p. xviii
Floyd, Mike, The Eel River Tribe of Indiana. (BookSurge Publishing, 2007)

External links
Former tribal website (now defunct)
Encyclopedia of Oklahoma History and Culture - Eel River

Native American history of Indiana
Miami tribe